Egon Brütsch Fahrzeugbau, usually shortened to Brütsch, was a German automotive design and automaker based in Stuttgart, Baden-Württemberg.

Brütsch were best known for producing many microcar designs, but only produced small numbers of each design and the primary function of the company appears to have been that of the development and promotion of each design to sell licences to manufacture to other companies.

Between 1952 and 1958, eleven different models of car were manufactured by Brütsch, but the total production of all models by the company is believed to be only eighty-one cars.

Many of the bodywork designs were simple two-piece mouldings of polyester reinforced with fiberglass, bonded at a waistline join, which was then covered by a protective strip. Chassis and suspension design was very rudimentary and after a misguided court action in 1956 by Brütsch against a licensee, at least one of Brütsch's designs was condemned as dangerous.
The abbreviated chassis used on the majority of the cars meant that for structural integrity they could not have doors and all these models had low sides to facilitate entry and exit.

Brütsch 200 "Spatz" or Dreirad-Dreisitzer 1954-1955

A 3-seater, 3-wheeled roadster, powered by a single cylinder 191 cc Fichtel & Sachs engine driving through a four speed gearbox. Also built under licence by A. Grünhut & Co of Switzerland with minor changes and sold as the Belcar. Another licence was sold to Alzmetall for production by Harald Friedrich GmbH of Germany, but so many faults were found with the original design that their production model, the Spatz Kabinenroller was fundamentally a different car. Because of this Brütsch took Alzmetall to court to ensure payment of his licence fees but lost the case.

Brütsch Zwerg 1955-1957

A 2-seater, 3-wheeled roadster, powered by a single cylinder 191 cc Fichtel & Sachs engine driving through a four speed gearbox. Also built under licence by Air Tourist Sàrl of France with minor changes and sold as the Avolette. Only four examples of the 2-seat Zwerg is known to still exist in England and are currently awaiting restoration.

Brütsch Zwerg - Einsitzer 1955-1956

A single seat, 3-wheeled roadster, powered by a single cylinder 74 cc DKW Hobby scooter engine driving through a continuously variable transmission. Three surviving cars was discovered in Germany in 2010 and have been restored.

Brütsch Mopetta 1956-1958

A single seat, 3-wheeled roadster, powered by a single cylinder 49 cc [ILO] engine driving through a three speed gearbox. Production was licensed to former Opel dealer Georg von Opel, who planned to build the Mopetta at a former Horex motorcycle factory, however this plan appears to have resulted in nothing more than the production of sales literature. Due to its unusual design and rarity, the Mopetta has been subject to many replicas.

Brütsch Rollera 1956-1958

A single seat, 3-wheeled roadster, powered by a single cylinder 98 cc Fichtel & Sachs engine driving through a three speed gearbox. Also built under licence by Air Tourist Sàrl of France.

Brütsch Bussard 1956-1958

A 2-seater, 3-wheeled roadster, powered by a single cylinder 191 cc Fichtel & Sachs engine driving through a four speed gearbox. One of the last known Bussards was recently written off after rotting away in England. Its windscreen, which remained, was donated to the owner of a Brütsch Pfeil (below), which had no original windscreen.

Brütsch Pfeil 1956-1958

A 2-seater, 4-wheeled roadster, powered by a twin cylinder 386 cc Lloyd engine driving through a three speed gearbox.

Brütsch V2 1956-1958

A 2-seater, 4-wheeled roadster. Both versions had a four speed gearbox and in total twelve cars were produced.

Brütsch V2-N 1958
A 2-seater, 4-wheeled roadster with doors. Powered by a twin cylinder 479 cc Fiat 500 engine driving through a four speed gearbox. This model was developed for  potential Indonesian licensee NGO, but the project eventually came to nothing.

References

External links 

 Comprehensive report on the racing cars driven by Egon Brütsch and the cars he designed on the web portal  oppositelock.kinja.com  with many pictures, retrieved January 5, 2017
 Pictures of a Brütsch Mopetta (vehicle collection Eppelheim)
 
 Die Ei-Autos von Egon Brütsch (Text42) (German)

Microcars
Three-wheeled motor vehicles
Defunct motor vehicle manufacturers of Germany